Mark Moran is a former professional rugby league footballer who played in the 1980s, 1990s and 2000s.

Playing career

International honours
Mark Moran won caps for Wales while at Leigh 1992 2-caps (interchange/substitute).

County Cup Final appearances
Mark Moran played  in Salford's 17-22 defeat by Wigan in the 1988 Lancashire County Cup Final during the 1988–89 season at Knowsley Road, St. Helens on Sunday 23 October 1988.

References

Leigh Leopards players
Living people
English people of Welsh descent
English rugby league players
Place of birth missing (living people)
Rugby league hookers
Rugby league wingers
Salford Red Devils players
Wales national rugby league team players
Woolston Rovers players
Year of birth missing (living people)